Øyvind Holen (born 4 January 1973) is a Norwegian journalist, comics creator and non-fiction writer.

Personal life
Holen hails from Lindeberg, a district in Groruddalen, Oslo. He was born on 4 January 1973, and is married to Marta Breen.

Career
A journalist, Holen has worked for or contributed to a number of newspapers, including Aftenposten, Dagsavisen, VG, Klassekampen, Bergens Tidende, Morgenbladet, Osloposten, Ny Tid, and Dagens Næringsliv.

He made his book debut in 2004 with the hiphop documentary Hiphop-hoder: Fra Beat Street til bygde-rap. His next books were Groruddalen: En reiseskildring (2005), Hiphop: Graffiti, rap, breaking, dj-ing (2009), and Faktaløve: Hiphop (2010). He was awarded the Sproing Award in 2012 for the comics album Drabant, shared with illustrator . Further books are Donald-landet (2012), Jævla bra byline (2014), Tegneserienes historie (2015), Getto (2021), and B.O.L.T Warhead. The Re Enforcement from 2022 (about an album by the Norwegian rap group ).

References

1973 births
Living people
People from Oslo
Norwegian journalists
Norwegian non-fiction writers
Comics creators from Oslo